The Roman Catholic Diocese of Tapachula is a Latin rite suffragan diocese of the Metropolitan Archdiocese of Tuxtla Gutiérrez.

It cathedral Episcopal see is the Catedral de San José, dedicated to Saint Joseph, in Tapachula, Chiapas. Its bishop is Jaime Calderón Calderón.

History 
It was erected on 19 June 1957 as Diocese of Tapachula / Tapacolen(sis) (Latin), on territory split off from the Diocese of Chiapas and suffragan of the Metropolitan Archdiocese of Antequera, Oaxaca until 25 November 2006.

Statistics 
As per 2014, it pastorally served 1,488,000 Catholics (83.9% of 1,773,000 total) on 12,244 km² in 47 parishes and 11 missions with 101 priests (90 diocesan, 11 religious), 142 lay religious (11 brothers, 131 sisters) and 66 seminarians.

Episcopal Ordinaries 
(all Roman Rite native Mexicans)

Suffragan Bishops of Tapachula 
 Adolfo Hernández Hurtado (1958.01.13 – 1970.09.06), next Bishop of Zamora (in Mexico) (1970.09.06 – 1974.12.12), Titular Bishop of Vicus Pacati (1974.12.12 – 2004.10.15) as Auxiliary Bishop of Archdiocese of Guadalajara (Mexico) (1974.12.12 – death 1997.03.20)
 Bartolomé Carrasco Briseño (1971.06.11 – 1976.06.11), previously Bishop of Huejutla (Mexico) (1963.08.19 – 1967.05.18), Titular Bishop of Claterna (1967.05.18 – 1971.06.11) as Auxiliary Bishop of Archdiocese of Antequera, Oaxaca (Mexico) (1967.05.18 – 1971.06.11); later Metropolitan Archbishop of above Antequera (1976.06.11 – retired 1993.10.04), died 1999
 Juvenal Porcayo Uribe (1976.07.03 – death 1983.06.30)
 Luis Miguel Cantón Marín (1984.03.30 – death 1990.05.10)
 Felipe Arizmendi Esquivel (1991.02.07 – 2000.03.31), also Secretary General of Latin American Episcopal Council (1999 – 2000), next Bishop of San Cristóbal de las Casas (Mexico) (2000.03.31 – ...)
 Rogelio Cabrera López (2001.07.16 – 2004.09.11), previously Bishop of Tacámbaro (Mexico) (1996.04.30 – 2001.07.16); later last Suffragan Bishop of Tuxtla Gutiérrez (Mexico) (2004.09.11 – 2006.11.25), 'first' Metropolitan Archbishop of Tuxtla Gutiérrez (Mexico) (2006.11.25 – 2012.10.03), Metropolitan Archbishop of Monterrey (Mexico) (2012.10.03 – ...)
 Leopoldo González González (2005.06.09 – 2017.06.30), previously Titular Bishop of Voncaria (1999.03.18 – 2005.06.09) as Auxiliary Bishop of Archdiocese of Morelia (Mexico) (1999.03.18 – 2005.06.09); later Metropolitan Archbishop of Acapulco (Mexico) (2017.06.30 – ...)

So far, it hasn't had any auxiliary bishop.

See also 
 List of Catholic dioceses in Mexico

Sources and external links and references 
 GCatholic - data for all sections
 

Roman Catholic dioceses in Mexico
Roman Catholic Ecclesiastical Province of Tuxtla Gutiérrez
Religious organizations established in 1957
Roman Catholic dioceses and prelatures established in the 20th century